ELMUS is a Canadian Electronic Music Laboratory, established by Hugh Le Caine after World War II. Funded by Canada's National Research Council, twenty-two new instruments were built over the next twenty years.

Laboratories in Canada
Music organizations based in Canada